Lynx was launched at Whitby in 1776. From 1777 to 1798 she traded with the Baltic. Between 1798 and 1811 Lynx engaged in whaling in Davis Strait, in the British northern whale fishery. She then changed to trading with New Brunswick; in 1812 a French privateer captured her.


Career
Lynx first appeared in Lloyd's List (LR) in 1778. She had already sailed to the Baltic early in 1777.

In 1786 Lynxs ownership shifted her registry to Hull. Her owners in 1787 were Jos. Barker, Thos. Middleton and James Atty. Her captain was Elisha Preston.

From 1798 to 1811 Lynx sailed from Hull on annual whaling voyages to Davis Strait. The data below is from Coltish, augmented with information from newspaper reports.

After her return from Davis Strait in 1811, her owners withdrew Lynx from whaling and started to sail her to North America.

Fate
Lynx, Dewar, master, sailed from Hull to New Brunswick. Her crew arrived safely at Kingsbridge.

The LR issue for 1813 carried the annotation "captured" under Lynxs name.

Citations

References
 
 

1776 ships
Ships built in Whitby
Age of Sail merchant ships of England
Whaling ships
Captured ships